The 1956–57 National Hurling League was the 26th season of the National Hurling League.

Division 1

Wexford came into the season as defending champions of the 1955-56 season. Antrim entered Division 1 as the promoted team from the previous season.

On 12 May 1957, Tipperary won the title following a 3-11 to 2-7 win over Kilkenny in the final. It was their 7th league title overall and their first since 1954-55.

Westmeath were relegated from Division 1.

Group 1A table

Group 1B table

Knock-out stage

Final

Division 2

Group 2A table

Group 2B table

Knock-out stage

Final

References

National Hurling League seasons
Lea
Lea